During the 1922–23 English football season, Brentford competed in the Football League Third Division South and finished in 14th place.

Season summary

After a promising 9th-place finish at the end of the 1921–22 Third Division South season, Brentford player-manager Archie Mitchell retired from playing in order to concentrate solely on management. Financial problems during the off-season meant that the squad was hit by the triple-departure of forwards Harry Anstiss, George Pither and long-serving wing half Alf Amos to league rivals Millwall. The previous season's leading goalscorer Harry Morris was successfully retained and the money generated from the sales allowed the squad's wages to be paid through the off-season. 11 new players were transferred in, with a contingent from the North East, including full back George Kell, half backs Bill Inglis and John Haggan and forwards Gordon Johnstone, Reginald Parker, Harry Stott and John Thain. Trainer Michael Whitham was replaced by former Bees manager Dusty Rhodes.

Despite Harry Morris scoring 10 goals in an 11 match spell early in the season, by early November 1921, Brentford were rooted in mid-table. A failure to convert draws into wins dropped the club down to 18th on Christmas Day and the sales of Harry Morris to Millwall and long-serving full back Bertie Rosier to Clapton Orient in February 1923 exacerbated the team's problems scoring and conceding goals. Though never looking in any danger of having to seek re-election, a run of goals from Gordon Johnstone and Reginald Parker inspired a seven match unbeaten spell from mid-March to mid-April which lifted Brentford to 14th. Three draws and two defeats in the final five matches of the season saw the Bees secure a 14th-place finish.

League table

Results
Brentford's goal tally listed first.

Legend

Football League Third Division South

FA Cup

 Sources: 100 Years of Brentford, Brentford Football Club History, The Complete History

Playing squad 
Players' ages are as of the opening day of the 1922–23 season.

 Sources: 100 Years of Brentford, Timeless Bees, Football League Players' Records 1888 to 1939, 100 Years Of Brentford

Coaching staff

Statistics

Appearances and goals

Players listed in italics left the club mid-season.
Source: 100 Years of Brentford

Goalscorers 

Players listed in italics left the club mid-season.
Source: 100 Years of Brentford

Management

Summary

Transfers and loans 
Cricketers are not included in this list.

References 

Brentford F.C. seasons
Brentford